Forese is a surname. Notable people with the surname include:

 Laura Forese, American pediatric orthopedic surgeon and hospital administrator
 Thomas Forese, American politician

See also
 Forese Donati, Italian nobleman